Bambangan Cakil is a classical dance-drama of Javanese people in—particularly—Central Java, Indonesia. This dance-drama is demonstrates wayang performance due to the movement is adopted from one of the scenes in wayang kulit performance, that is the Perang Kembang scene. The Perang Kembang told about war between kesatria against raksasa. The kesatria has soft and gentle-characters, while the raksasa described as character who is rough and violent.

The dance-drama war between kesatria (Bambangan) against raksasa (Cakil) could also be used as a place for a dalang'''s judgment in moving a puppet.

Philosophy
In Javanese culture, kesatria are always considered to be good figures, willing to defend the truth, to help others, etc. The kesatria title is given, rather than being heredity. For example, in the Mahabharata story, Kurawa does not have a kesatria title, even though he has the same ancestors as the Pandava.

On the other hand, raksasa are characterised as rough, violent and dynamic.

Characterizations
In the Bambangan Cakil dance-drama, Arjuna is depicted as kesatria, while Cakil is depicted as raksasa''.

See also

Gandrung
Ramayana Ballet
Wayang
Wayang wong
Javanese dance
Dance in Indonesia

References

External links
 Nama tari-tarian Indonesia 

Theatre in Indonesia
Traditional drama and theatre of Indonesia
Dances of Java